Robert Cuddon (fl. 1395), of Dunwich, Suffolk, was an English politician.

Family
Cuddon was the son of Peter Cuddon I and thus the brother of Peter Cuddon II. He was married and had at least one child, Richard Cuddon. All three men were also MPs.

Career
He was a Member (MP) of the Parliament of England for Dunwich in 1395.

References

Year of birth missing
Year of death missing
English MPs 1395
People from Dunwich